Some People Have Real Problems (sometimes stylised as Some People Have REAL Problems) is the fourth studio album by Australian singer Sia. Released in 2008, the album featured singles including "Day Too Soon", "The Girl You Lost to Cocaine" and "Soon We'll Be Found". In live performances of the latter song, Sia used sign language to accompany her singing. The album displays a more upbeat pop-style than Sia's previous downbeat albums, whilst show-casing Sia's vocals on a number of big ballads. Non-single track, "Buttons", received attention due to its video in which Sia's face is distorted by pegs, string, net, condoms and many other things. The album debuted at number 26 on the US Billboard 200 chart which became Sia's first album to chart on the Billboard 200 in her career.

Background
Sia, talking about the inspiration for the album's name, said: "During recording people would come in and complain about traffic, and I'd say, 'Some people have real problems.' Like, they're waiting for a lung or they don't have a mum," she says. "I thought it would be a funny name for an album. And then I thought if I were to get rich and successful I would remember to not turn into an asshole. But I am one, so it didn't work."

Reception

Some People Have Real Problems received generally favourable reviews from music critics. At Metacritic, which assigns a normalised rating out of 100 to reviews from mainstream critics, the album received an average score of 64, based on 20 reviews. Reviewers such as Rolling Stone and The Guardian (both of whom awarded the album 2 out of 5 stars) and Robert Christgau (who gave it a "dud" score) were highly critical. Other reviewers, however, such as Allmusic and Slant (both of whom awarded the album 4.5 out of 5 stars) and Entertainment Weekly (who gave the album an "A−") were highly positive towards the album.

Track listing
All tracks produced by Jimmy Hogarth.

"Buttons"
"Buttons" is a hidden track after "Lullaby" on the international edition of the album, but it is a normal track on the Australian edition, in which it was the first single. "Buttons" was written by Freescha and Sia.

Personnel

 Sia Furler – vocals
 Beck – backing vocals (tracks 6 and 9)
 Dan Carey – guitar (track 6)
 Tony Cousins – mastering
 Larry Goldings – keyboards (tracks 1–4, 7, 10, 12 and 13)
 Jimmy Hogarth – guitar (tracks 1, 4, 6, 11 and 13), keyboards (track 1), percussion (track 6)
 Jim Hunt – brass (tracks 5 and 11)
 Greg Kurstin – keyboards (track 9)
 Pantera Marvelous (Sia's pet dog) – backing vocals (track 9)
 Giovanni Ribisi – backing vocals (track 9)
 Jason Lee – backing vocals (track 9)
 Martin Slattery – clarinet and flute (track 6), percussion (track 3)
 Emery Dobyns — recording engineer
 Eric Spring — recording engineer
 Eddie Stevens – keyboards (tracks 2, 3, 5–11 and 13)
 Joey Waronker – drums (tracks 2–11 and 13), percussion (tracks 5, 7 and 8)
 Felix Bloxsom – drums (tracks 1 and 12), percussion (track 1)
 Jeremy Wheatley – mixing
 Khoa Truong – guitar tracking and arranging
 Samuel Dixon – bass guitar on all tracks

Sales and chart performance
Following its release, the album debuted at number 26 on the US Billboard 200 chart, selling about 20,000 copies in its first week. The album was also chosen as iTunes' Top Pop Album of 2008.

The album was certified Gold by the Australian Recording Industry Association in 2011.

Album

Certifications

Singles
The first single "Day Too Soon" was released on 12 November 2007 in the UK and was followed by "The Girl You Lost to Cocaine" on 21 April 2008 and later followed by "Soon We'll Be Found", which was released on 13 October 2008. "Buttons" was released as the fourth and final single in November 2008.

Release history

References

2008 albums
Hear Music albums
Sia (musician) albums